Sitgreaves National Forest was established by the U.S. Forest Service in Arizona on July 1, 1908 with  from portions of Black Mesa and Tonto National Forests.  In 1974 entire forest was administratively combined with Apache National Forest to create Apache-Sitgreaves National Forests. The Sitgreaves National Forest is located in the southern parts of Navajo, Coconino, and Apache counties. It had an area of 818,749 acres (3,313.4 km²) as of 30 September 2008. There are local ranger district offices in Lakeside and Overgaard.

The forest was named after Lorenzo Sitgreaves (d. May 14, 1888).  Sitgreaves was a lieutenant who made the first topographical mission across Arizona in 1851.

See also
 Sitgreaves Expedition
 Travis Walton UFO incident

References

External links 
 Forest History Society
 Listing of the National Forests of the United States and Their Dates (from Forest History Society website) Text from Davis, Richard C., ed. Encyclopedia of American Forest and Conservation History. New York: Macmillan Publishing Company for the Forest History Society, 1983. Vol. II, pp. 743–788.

Protected areas of Apache County, Arizona
Protected areas of Coconino County, Arizona
Former National Forests of Arizona
Protected areas of Navajo County, Arizona
Apache-Sitgreaves National Forests
1908 establishments in Arizona Territory
Protected areas established in 1908